Simon J. Hall, M.D., is the Associate Professor and Kyung Hyun Kim, M.D. Chair of Urology and Assistant Professor, Department of Gene and Cell Medicine at The Mount Sinai School of Medicine, as well as the Director of the Barbara and Maurice Deane Prostate Health and Research Center at The Mount Sinai Medical Center, both in New York City.

Hall is the author of four book chapters and more than 30 peer-reviewed articles. He has received fourteen grants and was listed among New York Magazine’s Best Doctors in 2007, 2008 and 2009.

Biography
Hall received his B.A. in biology in 1983 from Columbia College, Columbia University and his M.D. in 1988 from the Columbia University College of Physicians and Surgeons. His postdoctoral training included an internship and a junior residency in the department of surgery at The Mount Sinai School of Medicine. He was Chief Resident in the Department of Urology at Boston Medical Center and completed a fellowship in uro-oncology at Baylor College of Medicine.

From 1997 until 2001 Hall was the director of the Department of Urology at Elmhurst Hospital in Queens. In 2001, he was named director of the Barbara and Maurice Deane Prostate Health and Research Center at The Mount Sinai Medical Center, and in 2003 he was named Chair of Mount Sinai's Department of Urology. In 2009, he was named the Kyung Hyun Kim, M.D. Chair in Urology.

Hall's area of concentration is primarily urologic oncology including the diagnosis, evaluation and treatment of prostate cancer, renal cell cancer and urothelial (transitional cell) cancer affecting the kidneys and bladder, with special focus on the use of robotics and the development of minimally invasive treatment options.

Awards
1993:  Golden Filiform Award, Dept. of Urology, Boston University Medical Center
1996:  F. Brantly Scott Award, Scott Dept. of Urology,  Baylor College of Medicine
1997:  AUA/CaPCURE Award, 2nd Place, Pfizer Scholars in Urology Award
1999: Edwin Beer Award in Urology, New York Academy of Medicine
2001: Dr. Solomon Silver Award in Clinical Medicine, Mount Sinai School of Medicine
2007, 2008 & 2009: Best Doctors, Castle Connolly/New York Magazine

Clinical trials
Autologous PAP-loaded dendritic cell vaccine (APC8015, Provenge) in patients with non-metastatic prostate cancer who experience PSA failure after radical prostatectomy. Sponsor: Denedron Corp, GCO#01-0592.
Autologous PAP-loaded dendritic cell vaccine (APC8015, Provenge) in patients with hormone refractory disease. Sponsor: Dendreon Corp.
A Randomized, Multicenter, Single Blind Study in Men with Metastatic Androgen Independent Prostate Cancer to Evaluate Sipuleucel-T Manufactured with Different Concentrations of PA2024 Antigen (P07-2) Sponsor: Dendreon Corp, GCO #08-0813.

Book Chapters
Partial list:

Thompson, TC, Timme, TL, Hall, SJ, and Stapleton, AMF. Perspectives on the Molecular Biology of Prostate Cancer, In  Vogelzang, NJ, Scardino, PT, Shipley, WU, and Coffey, DS. (Eds.) Comprehensive Textbook of Genitourinary Oncology, Williams & Wilkins, Baltimore, MD, 1996. .
Hall SJ, Kresina TF, Trauger R, and. Conley BA. Gene Therapy for the Treatment of Cancer, In Kresina TF (Ed.), An Introduction to Molecular Medicine and Gene Therapy, John Wiley & Sons, New York, NY. 2001. .
Millikan RE and Hall SJ. New Possibilities in Systemic Treatment for Metastatic Bladder Cancer, In Droller MJ (Ed.), Bladder Cancer: Current Diagnosis and Treatment, Humana Press, Totowa, NJ. p. 393-422, 2001. .

Publications
Partial list:

References

External links
The Mount Sinai Hospital homepage
The Mount Sinai School of Medicine homepage
The Barbara and Maurice Deane Prostate Health and Research Center at The Mount Sinai Medical Center
 "Prostate Cancer: A New Look". Katie Charles (March 25, 2009). New York Daily News.
Excerpt from Dr. Simon J. Hall's Foreword to Eat to Beat Prostate Cancer by David Ricketts. STC Healthy Living, publisher. 

Cancer researchers
Columbia University Vagelos College of Physicians and Surgeons alumni
Living people
Icahn School of Medicine at Mount Sinai faculty
Year of birth missing (living people)
Columbia College (New York) alumni